Siddhartha Paul Tiwari FRAS (born 1979) is an academic, technologist and researcher. Currently, he works with Google Asia Pacific, Singapore. Prior to this, he led Google's global learning and development efforts from Tokyo. He is known for his work in the areas of e-governance, mobile technologies, digital intervention strategies, and information and communication technologies (ICTs). Among his publications are the monograph, 'The Impact of New Technologies on Society: A Blueprint for the Future', as well as numerous essays and speeches. As a keynote speaker at numerous conferences, he has presented his viewpoints on technology. His lectures and writings frequently address the subject of digital media and technology.

Career
During his career, Tiwari has been actively involved in the development of user trust, safety, and privacy. Between 2005 and 2006, he served as a member of the committee of All India Council for Technical Education (AICTE).

Tiwari is widely quoted as saying: "India’s happy future lies in combining talent and technology."

In 2006 Tiwari was awarded the India Science Award for his work. In 2010, he served as UNESCO Chair Professor at the Department of Science and Technology, Government of India.

Previously, Tiwari has held faculty positions at Indian Institute of Management Indore, Indian Institute of Technology Roorkee, Atal Bihari Vajpayee Indian Institute of Information Technology and Management, Indian Institute of Technology Delhi, and Tokyo Institute of Technology. He was also part of National Assessment and Accreditation Council's curriculum reform committee and was involved in setting the curriculum for postgraduate engineering and technology programs in India.

As a researcher, he has contributed to the field such as sustainable development, including agriculture. Currently, his research is focused on sustainability.

Currently, he is working with Google Asia.

Awards and Honors
 2006: India Science Award
 2010: UNESCO Chair Professor, at the Department of Science and Technology, Government of India

Early life and background
Tiwari was born in Jabalpur but raised in Shimla, Junagadh, Delhi and Indore.

He is the grandson of Captain B P Tiwari, a prominent Indian politician who served as Chairman of District Development Council, Jabalpur, and the son of Dr S Prakash Tiwari a retired Vice Chancellor of S K Rajasthan University, Bikaner and a former Director of NAARM, Hyderabad, who represented the country in important diplomatic missions.

Books Authored
 The Impact of New Technologies on Society: A Blueprint for the Future, Registered at National Library of Poland, Warsaw, 2022, Scholarly Publishers RS Global Sp. z O.O.

Creation of new curricula and courses
To adapt to the rapidly changing teaching environment and to incorporate new technologies into the university curriculum, Tiwari has developed the following course credits and curriculum at a postgraduate level.

 A course on technology and its impact on society was developed and launched by Tiwari as part of the civil service training offered to Indian Administrative Service trainee officers at Lal Bahadur Shastri National Academy of Administration.
 His research resulted in the development and launch of a postgraduate credit course on "Digital Marketing" at the Indian Institute of Management Indore.
 A course on 'Technology Management and the Asian Regulatory Framework' has been developed and launched by him at Indian Institute of Technology Delhi.

Selected publications 
 Tiwari, Siddhartha Paul (2008). Information and communication technology initiatives for knowledge sharing in agriculture. Indian Journal of Agricultural Sciences, 78(9), 737-747.
 Rajat K. Baisya; Tiwari, Siddhartha Paul (2008). E-governance Challenges and Strategies for Better-managed Projects. Emerging Technologies in E-Government, 203-208.
 Tiwari, Siddhartha Paul (2017). Emerging trends in the soybean industry. Soybean Research 15(1): 01-17.
 Tiwari, Siddhartha Paul; Tiwari, SP (2018). Is export-oriented and currency dynamics-based Indian soybean revolution environment-friendly?. Current Science, Indian Academy of Sciences, 114(08), pp. 1604- 1605.
 Tiwari, Siddhartha Paul (2022). Re-emergence of Asia in the New Industrial Era. Technium Social Sciences Journal, 29(1), 471–480.
 Tiwari, Siddhartha Paul (2022). Knowledge Management Strategies and Emerging Technologies - an Overview of the Underpinning Concepts. International Journal of Innovative Technologies in Economy, (1(37).

References

Living people
Academic staff of IIT Delhi
Indian academic administrators
1979 births
21st-century Indian educators
Educationists from India
People from Jabalpur
IIT Delhi alumni
Indian computer scientists
Educators from Madhya Pradesh
Fellows of the Royal Asiatic Society
People from Indore
Google employees
People in information technology